The 2001–02 season are the Esteghlal Football Club's 1st season in the Iran Pro League, and their 8th consecutive season in the top division of Iranian football. They are also competing in the Hazfi Cup and Asian Club Championship, and 57th year in existence as a football club.

Club

Kit 

|
|
|}

Coaching staff

Other information

Player
As of 1 September 2013. Esteghlal F.C. Iran Pro League Squad 2001–02

Competitions

Overview

Iran Pro League

Standings

Results summary

Results by round

Matches

Hazfi Cup

Round of 32

Round of 16

Quarterfinals

Semifinal

Final

Asian Club Championship

First round

Second round

Quarterfinals

West Asia

Semifinals

Third place match

See also
 2001–02 Iran Pro League
 2001–02 Hazfi Cup
 2001–02 Asian Club Championship

References

External links
 Iran Premier League Statistics
 RSSSF

2001-02
Iranian football clubs 2001–02 season